Bob Beattie (born 1 September 1943) is a former Australian rules footballer who played for  in the Victorian Football League (VFL).

Football

On 6 July 1963, playing on the half-back flank, he was a member of the young and inexperienced Fitzroy team that comprehensively and unexpectedly defeated Geelong, 9.13 (67) to 3.13 (31) in the 1963 Miracle Match.

See also
 1963 Miracle Match

Notes

External links
 
 

1943 births
Australian rules footballers from Victoria (Australia)
Fitzroy Football Club players
Living people